The "Rocca of Ischia di Castro" is the most conspicuous monument of Ischia di Castro's medieval castle, called by locals "La Rocca". It was early one of the oldest residence of the Farnese family.

Its structure shows the different stages recognizable from its current configuration. Directly built on tufa stone, his original part dates back to the eleventh century. It is further fortified in the fourteenth century. Of this phase remain in the three towers built in the Renaissance reconstruction unfortunately remained unfinished, attributed to Antonio da Sangallo the Younger, architect, of the Farnese, who changed the castle into a palace. Of the three towers, the south-east, in medieval times defending the drawbridge, then transformed into a gateway to the historic center, was probably cut off, then raised in the eighteenth century, to install the clock. The center was filled to support the thrust of the new construction, the right wing of a Renaissance palace. The third, which is access to the building, is docked. The restructuring resulted in a transformation of Sangallo typological and aesthetic of severe medieval building, giving the primitive structure of the new look of palace, characterized by an airy loggia structure of travertine, then it also buffered, but remains a significant example of residence civilian families most of the time.

Castles in Lazio
Farnese residences
Duchy of Castro